Jimmy Connors was the defending champion and won in the final 6–0, 6–0, 6–4 against Geoff Masters.

Seeds

  Jimmy Connors (champion)
  Raúl Ramírez (first round)
  Arthur Ashe (second round)
  John Alexander (first round)
  Tony Roche (first round)
  Tom Gorman (second round)
  John Newcombe (semifinals)
  Ken Rosewall (quarterfinals)

Draw

Section 1

Section 2

External links
 1978 Custom Credit Australian Indoor Championships Draw

Singles